The following radio stations broadcast on FM frequency 99.7 MHz:

Argentina
 Alegría in Córdoba
 Angelica in Angélica, Santa Fe
 Argentina in Mina Clavero, Córdoba
 Centro in Santa Rosa, Corrientes
 Cordial in Las Breñas, Chaco
 Cristal in Villa Unión, La Rioja
 Espacio in Villa General Belgrano, Córdoba
 Frecuencia Romántica in San Luis
 Gospel in Rosario, Santa Fe
 La Balsa in Villa Gesell, Buenos Aires
 La Cima in Tupungato, Mendoza
 Las Higueras in Las Higueras, Córdoba
 Libertad in Porteña, Córdoba
 Live in Eldorado, Misiones
 Latina Digital in Moreno, Buenos Aires
 Nuevos Aires in La Plata, Buenos Aires
 Ruta in Sanagasta, La Rioja
 Santa Lucía Department in San Juan
 Tradición in Berazategui, Buenos Aires
 UNNE in Corrientes
 Voces in Salta

Australia
 2SSR in Sydney, New South Wales
 Rhema FM in Newcastle, New South Wales
 2RGF in Griffith, New South Wales
 ABC Local Radio in Yulara, Northern Territory
 Radio National in Alice Springs, Northern Territory
 4RED in Redcliffe, Queensland
 Sea FM in Scottsdale, Tasmania
 3MCR in Mansfield, Victoria
 3MRR in Corryong, Victoria
 Radio National in Horsham, Victoria
 Radio National in Omeo, Victoria
 Radio National in Geraldton, Western Australia

Canada (Channel 259)
 CBON-FM-2 in Haileybury, Ontario
 CBUF-FM-9 in Victoria, British Columbia
 CFFM-FM-1 in 100 Mile House (Mount Timothy), British Columbia
 CFNA-FM in Bonnyville, Alberta
 CFXO-FM in Okotoks/High River, Alberta
 CKNC-FM in Simcoe, Ontario
 CHJM-FM in St-Georges-de-Beauce, Quebec
 CHME-FM-1 in Tadoussac, Quebec
 CHME-FM-2 in Sacre Coeur, Quebec
 CHME-FM-3 in Forestville, Quebec
 CHPH-FM in Wemindji, Quebec
 CIQC-FM in Campbell River, British Columbia
 CIYN-FM-1 in Goderich, Ontario
 CJAY-FM-3 in Invermere, British Columbia
 CJOT-FM in Ottawa, Ontario
 CJRI-FM-3 in New Bandon, New Brunswick
 CJVR-FM-3 in Carrot River, Saskatchewan
 CKAJ-FM-1 in La Baie, Quebec
 CKDY in Digby, Nova Scotia 
 CKPT-FM in Peterborough, Ontario
 VF2149 in Lac Allard, Quebec
 VF2458 in Passmore, British Columbia

China 
 CNR Music Radio in Yinchuan

Kuwait
 Radio Kuwait Superstation, Kuwait City

Latvia
 Radio SWH in Pavilosta

Malaysia
 Raaga in Malacca & North Johor

Mexico
XHBTH-FM in San Bartolo Tutotepec, Hidalgo
XHCPBR-FM in San Javier, Sonora
XHCOC-FM in Colima, Colima
XHEPI-FM in Tixtla de Guerrero, Guerrero
XHETR-FM in Ciudad Valles, San Luis Potosí
XHHID-FM in Ciudad Hidalgo, Michoacán
XHHRH-FM in Huejutla de Reyes, Hidalgo
XHIT-FM in Ciudad del Carmen, Campeche
XHLAC-FM in Lázaro Cárdenas, Michoacán
 XHOH-FM in Durango, Durango
XHOL-FM in Chignautla, Puebla
XHORF-FM in Mochicahui, Sinaloa
XHPB-FM in Veracruz, Veracruz
 XHPL-FM in Ciudad Acuña, Coahuila
XHPLVI-FM in Calvillo, Aguascalientes
XHPYUC-FM in Peto, Yucatán
XHRUA-FM in Uruapan, Michoacán
 XHSCCG-FM in Ciudad Nezahualcóyotl, State of Mexico
 XHSP-FM in Monterrey, Nuevo León
 XHTY-FM in Tijuana, Baja California
XHUAH-FM in Pachuca, Hidalgo
XHUAX-FM in Toluca, Estado de México

Morocco
Atlantic Radio in Agadir

Paraguay
Educación in Ciudad del Este

Philippines

DYEA in Sofronio Española, Palawan

Taiwan
 Nantou Radio in Taichung

United States (Channel 259)
 KAFZ in Ash Fork, Arizona
 KARZ (FM) in Marshall, Minnesota
 KBCY in Tye, Texas
  in Muscatine, Iowa
 KBOD in Gainesville, Missouri
  in Neosho, Missouri
 KBZD in Amarillo, Texas
 KCDI-LP in Dodge City, Kansas
 KCHT in Childress, Texas
 KCIG-LP in Craig, Colorado
 KESC in Morro Bay, California
 KETE in Sulphur Bluff, Texas
 KGHF in Belle Plaine, Kansas
 KHGV-LP in Houston, Texas
  in Yakima, Washington
  in Mountain Pass, California
  in Porterville, California
 KKDG in Durango, Colorado
 KKZN-LP in Show Low, Arizona
 KLHG-LP in Galveston, Texas
 KLMY in Long Beach, Washington
  in Wasilla, Alaska
  in Shreveport, Louisiana
  in Bend, Oregon
  in San Francisco, California
 KNAH in Alva, Oklahoma
  in Ogallala, Nebraska
 KOYM-LP in Houston, Texas
 KPJM-LP in Payson, Arizona
 KQRK in Pablo, Montana
 KQUA-LP in Roseburg, Oregon
  in Rock Springs, Wyoming
 KTOR in Gerber, California
 KTTR-FM in Saint James, Missouri
 KVST (FM) in Huntsville, Texas
 KVUT in Cuney, Texas
 KWPS-FM in Caddo Valley, Arkansas
  in Browerville, Minnesota
  in Fort Dodge, Iowa
 KYLQ in Encinal, Texas
 KZEB-LP in Jamestown, North Dakota
 KZPT in Kansas City, Missouri
  in Newport Village, New York
  in Tuckerton, New Jersey
 WBVL-LP in Kissimmee, Florida
  in Staunton, Virginia
 WCYZ in Silver Springs Shore, Florida
  in Louisville, Kentucky
 WDKF in Sturgeon Bay, Wisconsin
  in Wakefield-Peacedale, Rhode Island
 WGCK-FM in Coeburn, Virginia
 WIDT-LP in Winter Garden, Florida
  in Ironwood, Michigan
 WIWI-LP in Milwaukee, Wisconsin
  in Vero Beach, Florida
  in Jackson, Mississippi
 WJUX in South Fallsburg, New York
  in Paulding, Ohio
 WLCQ-LP in Feeding Hills, Massachusetts
  in Memphis, Tennessee
 WMLA-LP in Moose Lake, Minnesota
 WMYU-LP in Ooltewah, Tennessee
  in New London, New Hampshire
  in Dothan, Alabama
 WQXY-LP in Fort Myers, Florida
 WRFX in Kannapolis, North Carolina
 WRKZ in Columbus, Ohio
 WSHH in Pittsburgh, Pennsylvania
 WSHW in Frankfort, Indiana
 WTCS-LP in Chattanooga, Tennessee
  in Midland, Michigan
 WUGO in Grayson, Kentucky
  in Mount Carmel, Pennsylvania
  in Black River Falls, Wisconsin
 WWRG-LP in Lake Mary, Florida
 WWSO-LP in Hillsville, Virginia
  in Hendersonville, Tennessee
 WWWQ in Atlanta, Georgia
  in Hillsboro, Illinois
 WXCN-LP in Lexington, Kentucky
  in Hollywood, South Carolina
 WYFI in Norfolk, Virginia
  in Palmyra, New York

References

Lists of radio stations by frequency